Machadoe's girdled lizard (Cordylus machadoi) is a flattened girdled lizard from southwestern Angola and northwestern Namibia.  They are found as solitary individuals or in pairs on rock outcrops in arid savannah.  It can be identified, along with Cordylus vittifer, by have an elongate first row of dorsal scales.  Machadoe's girdled lizard is uniform yellow brown above and paler below.  The head is dark brown with pale lips.  The pale vertebral stripe found in the Cordylus vittifer is not present.  Adults reach 78 mm in length from snout to vent.

References

Branch, B., 1998.  Field Guide to Snakes and other Reptiles of Southern Africa: Ralph Curtis Books Publishing, Sanibel Island, Florida, 399 p.

Cordylus
Reptiles of Namibia
Reptiles of Angola
Reptiles described in 1964
Taxa named by Raymond Laurent